Danny Kurmann (born 10 January 1966) is an ice hockey referee from Switzerland.

Career 

Kurmann began officiating in 1983 in amateur leagues. In 1989, he was first appointed to the Swiss National League A, in which he served as a linesman during his first three seasons. He was promoted to the position of referee in 1993. In 1997, he signed a full-time contract with the Swiss Ice Hockey Association, giving up his job as an air conditioning technician.

Danny Kurmann has officiated in several international tournaments. He officiated at the Ice Hockey World Championships in 1999, 2000, 2001, 2003, 2004, 2007, 2008 and 2009; the IIHF World U20 Championship in 1999, 2000, 2003, 2007, 2008 and 2009; and at the Olympic Games in 2002, 2006, and 2010.
He has participated in the IIHF Referee Exchange Program since its introduction in 2004.

In April 2017, Kurmann retired from refereeing to take a job as an officiating manager with the IIHF.

References 

                   

1966 births
Living people

Swiss ice hockey officials